Søndre Nordstrand (Southern Nordstrand) is a borough of the city of Oslo, Norway. It is the southernmost borough of Oslo, bordering Nordstrand. As of 2020 it has 39,066 inhabitants and the highest rate of immigrant population at 56%. It is the only borough of Oslo that has a majority-minority population.

Neighborhoods in Søndre Nordstrand include:
 Holmlia
 Hvervenbukta
 Mortensrud
 Hauketo
 Prinsdal
 Bjørndal
 Klemetsrud

References 

Boroughs of Oslo
Ethnic enclaves in Norway